Marquis reagent is used as a simple spot-test to presumptively identify alkaloids as well as other compounds. It is composed of a mixture of formaldehyde and concentrated sulfuric acid, which is dripped onto the substance being tested. The United States Department of Justice method for producing the reagent is the addition of 100 mL of concentrated (95–98%) sulfuric acid to 5 mL of 40% formaldehyde. Different compounds produce different color reactions. Methanol may be added to slow down the reaction process to allow better observation of the colour change.

It was first discovered in 1896 and described by the Russian (Estonian) pharmacologist, Eduard Marquis (1871–1944) in his magister dissertation in 1896; and named after him, and was tested for the first time at the University of Dorpat. The reagent should be stored in the freezer for maximum shelf life

It is the primary presumptive test used in Ecstasy reagent testing kits. It can also be used to test for such substances as opiates (e.g. codeine, heroin), and phenethylamines (e.g. 2C-B, mescaline).

The test is performed by scraping off a small amount of the substance and adding a drop of the reagent (which is initially clear and colorless).  The results are analyzed by viewing the color of the resulting mixture, and by the time taken for the change in color to become apparent:

Results
Reagent test results develop very quickly and due to reactions with moisture and oxygen in air, any changes after the first 60 seconds should be discarded.

Mechanism
The colour change from morphine is proposed to be a result of two molecules of morphine and two molecules of formaldehyde condensing to the dimeric product which is protonated to the oxocarbenium salt.

See also
Drug checking
Drug test
Dille–Koppanyi reagent
Folin's reagent
Froehde reagent
Liebermann reagent
Mandelin reagent
Mecke reagent
Simon's reagent
Zwikker reagent

References

External links
 Drug Testing Kit FAQ - Marquis reagent colors list, very comprehensive.  Erowid.org
 DHPedia - Marquis reagent: A comprehensive list of colour reactions (inducing photographs of results)

Chemical tests
Analytical reagents
Drug testing reagents